Rick White may refer to:

Rick White (rock climber) (1946–2004), Australian rock climber
Rick White (politician) (born 1953), American politician
Rick White (baseball) (born 1968), former Major League Baseball pitcher
Rick White (musician) (born 1970), Canadian lo-fi musician and record producer

See also
Richard White (disambiguation)